The 2019 PDC Unicorn World Youth Championship was the ninth edition of the PDC World Youth Championship, a tournament organised by the Professional Darts Corporation for darts players aged between 16 and 23.

The group stage and knock-out phase from the last 32 to the semi-finals were played at Robin Park Centre, Wigan, on 4 November 2019. The final took place on 24 November 2019 at Butlin's Minehead, before the final of the 2019 Players Championship Finals.

Belgium's Dimitri Van den Bergh was the two-time defending champion after defeating Martin Schindler of Germany 6–3 in the 2018 final, but he was unable to defend his title, as he was over the age limit.

Luke Humphries won the tournament for the first time with a 6–0 win over Adam Gawlas in the final.

Prize money

Qualifiers
72 players from the final 2019 PDC Development Tour Order of Merit were set to qualify, as were 23 international qualifiers and Max Hopp, who was ranked in the top 32 of the main PDC Order of Merit at the start of the year and therefore took the top seeding place. Christian Bunse, Liam Gallagher, Brad Phillips, Martin Schindler and Jurjen van der Velde qualified through the Development Tour Order of Merit as well as through an International Qualifier, while Development Tour #15 Corey Cadby and International Qualifiers Jaime Nunez and Sarthak Patel withdrew prior to the event, meaning the players ranked 73 to 80 qualified as well.

PDC Order of Merit Qualifiers:
  Max Hopp

Development Tour Qualifiers:

International qualifiers:

  Maxim Aldoshin
  Gauke van der Boon
  Tremaine Gallagher
  Tomoya Goto
  Kieran Guina
  Jamai van den Herik
  Justin Hewitt
  Patrik Kovács
  Axel Ljungquist
  Hampus Norrström
  Erik Pu
  Jamie Rundle
  Evan Suderman
  Dolreich Tongcopanon Jr.
  Jacob Womack
  Xiaochen Zong

Draw

Group stage

Group 1

Group 2

Group 3

Group 4

Group 5

Group 6

Group 7

Group 8

Group 9

Group 10

Group 11

Group 12

Group 13

Group 14

Group 15

Group 16

Group 17

Group 18

Group 19

Group 20

Group 21

Group 22

Group 23

Group 24

Group 25

Group 26

Group 27

Group 28

Group 29

Group 30

Group 31

Group 32

Knockout Phase

References

World Youth Championship
PDC World Youth Championship
PDC World Youth Championship
2019
PDC World Youth Championship